The deben was an ancient Egyptian weight unit.

Old and Middle Kingdom

Similar weights from the Middle Kingdom were discovered at Lisht. From the Middle Kingdom date also deben weight units used for metals, referred to as copper deben and gold deben, the former being about twice as heavy as the latter.

New Kingdom
It was divided into ten kidet (alt. kit, kite or qedet), or into what is referred to by Egyptologists  as 'pieces', one twelfth of a deben weighing . It was frequently used to denote value of goods, by comparing their worth to a weight of metal, generally silver or copper.

Protocurrency
It has been speculated that pieces of metal weighing a deben were kept in boxes, taken to markets, and were used as a means of exchange. Archaeologists have been unable to find any such standardized pieces of precious metal. On the other hand, it is documented that debens served to compare values. In the 19th Dynasty, a slave girl priced four deben and one kite of silver was paid for with various goods: 6 bronze vessels, 10 deben of copper, 15 linen garments, a shroud, a blanket, and a pot of honey.

Legacy
Debens appeared in the computer game Pharaoh as its currency (in the form of gold).

See also
 Ancient Egyptian units of measurement
 Egyptian units of measurement

References

Units of mass
Egyptian hieroglyphs